William Walter White (26 July 1907 – ???) was a Scottish professional footballer whose clubs included Bristol Rovers, Aldershot, Carlisle United, Bristol City and Gillingham.  He made 268 appearances in the Football League.

References

1907 births
Year of death missing
Scottish footballers
Reading F.C. players
Bristol Rovers F.C. players
Southport F.C. players
Charlton Athletic F.C. players
Gillingham F.C. players
Aldershot F.C. players
Carlisle United F.C. players
Manchester City F.C. players
Newport County A.F.C. players
Bristol City F.C. players
Lincoln City F.C. players
Hull City A.F.C. players
Footballers from Kirkcaldy
Association football forwards